Edward Dutton may refer to:

 Edward Payson Dutton (1831–1923), founder of American publisher E. P. Dutton
Edward Dutton Cook (1829–1883), British dramatic critic and author
 Edward Dutton, 4th Baron Sherborne (1831–1919), British peer and diplomat